The  was established during the Edo period as a subroute to Nikkō Kaidō. It connects the Nakasendō with the Nikkō Kaidō.

Stations of the Nikkō Reiheishi Kaidō
The 21 post stations of the Nikkō Reiheishi Kaidō, with their present-day municipalities listed beside them.

Gunma Prefecture

 Kuragano-shuku (Takasaki) (also part of the Nakasendō)
 Tamamura-shuku (玉村宿) (Tamamura, Sawa District)
 Goryō-shuku (五料宿) (Tamamura, Sawa District)
 Shiba-shuku (柴宿) (Isesaki)
 Sakai-shuku (境宿) (Isesaki)
 Kizaki-shuku (木崎宿) (Ōta)
 Ōta-shuku (太田宿) (Ōta)

Tochigi Prefecture

See also
Kaidō
Edo Five Routes

References

Road transport in Japan
Edo period